Mark Kurlansky (December 7, 1948) is an American journalist and writer of general interest non-fiction. He has written a number of books of fiction and non-fiction. His 1997 book, Cod: A Biography of the Fish That Changed the World (1997), was an international bestseller and was translated into more than 15 languages. His book Nonviolence: Twenty-five Lessons From the History of a Dangerous Idea (2006) was the non-fiction winner of the 2007 Dayton Literary Peace Prize.

Life and work
Kurlansky was born in Hartford, Connecticut on December 7, 1948. He attended Butler University, where he earned a BA in 1970.  From 1976 to 1991 he worked as a correspondent in Western Europe for the Miami Herald, The Philadelphia Inquirer, and eventually the Paris-based International Herald Tribune. He moved to Mexico in 1982, where he continued to practice journalism.  In 2007 he was named the Baruch College Harman writer-in-residence.

Kurlansky wrote his first book, A Continent of Islands, in 1992 and went on to write several more throughout the 1990s. His third work of nonfiction, Cod: A Biography of the Fish That Changed the World,  won the 1998 James Beard Award. It became an international bestseller and was translated into more than 15 languages. His work and contribution to Basque identity and culture was recognized in 2001 when the Society of Basque Studies in America named him to the Basque Hall of Fame. That same year, he was awarded an honorary ambassadorship from the Basque government.

As a teenager, Kurlansky called Émile Zola his "hero", and in 2009, he translated one of Zola's novels, The Belly of Paris, whose theme is the food markets of Paris.

Kurlansky's 2009 book, The Food of a Younger Land, with the lengthy subtitle "A portrait of American food – before the national highway system, before chain restaurants, and before frozen food, when the nation's food was seasonal, regional, and traditional – from the lost WPA files", details American foodways in the early 20th century.

Publications

Nonfiction

 A Continent of Islands: Searching for the Caribbean Destiny (1992), Addison-Wesley Publishing. 
 A Chosen Few: The Resurrection of European Jewry (1995), 
 Cod: A Biography of the Fish That Changed the World (1997), 
 The Basque History of the World (1999), 
 Salt: A World History (2002), 
 1968: The Year that Rocked the World (2004), 
 The Big Oyster: History on the Half Shell (2006), 
 Nonviolence: The History of a Dangerous Idea (2006), 
 Nonviolence: Twenty-five Lessons From the History of a Dangerous Idea (2006), 
 The Last Fish Tale: The Fate of the Atlantic and Survival in Gloucester, America's Oldest Fishing Port and Most Original Town (2008), 
 The Food of a Younger Land (2009), 
 The Eastern Stars: How Baseball Changed the Dominican Town of San Pedro de Macoris (2010), 
 World Without Fish (2011), this work was chosen by many school districts to be used in their curriculum as part of EL education, including Wake County Public School System.
 What?: Are These the 20 Most Important Questions in Human History—Or Is This a Game of 20 Questions? (2011), 
 Hank Greenberg: The Hero Who Didn't Want to Be One (2011), 
 Birdseye: The Adventures of a Curious Man (2012), 
 Ready for a Brand New Beat: How "Dancing in the Street" Became the Anthem for a Changing America (2013), 
 International Night: A Father and Daughter Cook Their Way Around the World with Talia Kurlansky (2014), 
 Paper: Paging Through History (2016), 
 Havana: A Subtropical Delirium (2017), 
 Milk!: A 10,000-Year Food Fracas (2018), 
 Bugless: Why Ladybugs, Butterflies, Fireflies, and Bees are Disappearing (2019), 
 Salmon and the Earth: The History of a Common Fate (2020), 
 The Unreasonable Virtue of Fly Fishing (2021), 
 The Importance of Not Being Ernest: My Life with the Uninvited Hemingway (2022),

Fiction
 The White Man in the Tree, and Other Stories (2000), 
 Boogaloo on 2nd Avenue: A Novel of Pastry, Guilt, and Music (2005), 
 Edible Stories: A Novel in Sixteen Parts (2010), 
 City Beasts: Fourteen Stories of Uninvited Wildlife (2015),

Children's books
 The Cod's Tale, illustrated by S. D. Schindler (G. P. Putnam's Sons, 2001), 
 The Girl Who Swam to Euskadi (Reno, NV: Center for Basque Studies, 2005),  
 The Story of Salt, illus. S. D. Schindler (Putnam, 2006), 
 Battle Fatigue (Walker Books & Co., 2011), young-adult historical novel, 
 Frozen in Time: Clarence Birdseye's Outrageous Idea About Frozen Food (2014), 165 pp.

As editor
Choice Cuts: A Savory Selection of Food Writing From Around the World and Throughout History (2002),

As translator
The Belly of Paris by Émile Zola, Mark Kurlansky as translator. The Modern Library, 2009.

Awards
 1998: James A. Beard Award for excellence in food writing
 2006: Bon Appétit Food Writer of the Year
 2007: Nonfiction winner of the Dayton Literary Peace Prize for Nonviolence: Twenty-five Lessons From the History of a Dangerous Idea (2006).
 2007: Honorary Doctor of Letters, Butler University
 2011: Gold Award, National Parenting Publications Awards for World Without Fish
 Pluma Plata award for Salt

References

External links

 
 

1948 births
21st-century American historians
21st-century American Jews
21st-century American male writers
21st-century translators
American male journalists
American male non-fiction writers
Butler University alumni
Historians from Connecticut
James Beard Foundation Award winners
Jewish American writers
Living people
Microhistorians
Translators of Émile Zola
Writers from Hartford, Connecticut